Take It While It's Hot is the debut album of the New York-based Latin freestyle trio Sweet Sensation. Released in 1988, this album continued the Freestyle movement of the late 1980s brought on by groups such as Exposé, the Cover Girls, and Seduction. The album went to #63 on the Billboard pop albums chart and spawned five hit singles: "Hooked on You", "Victim of Love", "Take It While It's Hot", "Never Let You Go", and "Sincerely Yours".

Early pressings of the album featured original members Betty LeBron, Margie Fernandez, and Mari Fernandez on the front cover. Later pressings of the album featured Sheila Vega on the front cover, who replaced Mari Fernandez. The album's vocals, however, were not rerecorded after the personnel change.

The French house duo, Together, sampled Sweet Sensation's "Sincerely Yours" for their 2000 single, "Together".

Track listing
 "Never Let You Go" (6:08)
 "Sincerely Yours" (4:50)
 "Love Games" (4:17)
 "Let Me be the One" (5:10)
 "Heartbreak" (4:37)
 "Take it While it's Hot" (4:59)
 "Victim of Love" (5:45)
 "Hooked on You" (5:06)

Notes 

1988 debut albums
Atco Records albums
Sweet Sensation albums